Elafonisi (  "deer island") is an island located close to the southwestern corner of the Mediterranean island of Crete, of which it is administratively a part, in the regional unit of Chania. When the weather is fine it is possible to walk to the island through the shallow water. The island is a protected nature reserve.
It is known for its pink sand beaches, created by tidal and wave-induced deposits of pigmented microorganisms living in a symbiotic relationship with native seaweed.

Greek War of Independence
At the highest point on the island there is a plaque that commemorates a tragic event. On Easter Sunday of 18 April 1824 several hundred Greeks, mostly women and children, were killed on Elafonisi by Ottoman soldiers. To avoid advancing Turkish Ottoman troops, forty armed men had taken refuge on the island with women, children and old folk where they were waiting for a ship to take them to the Ionian Islands. The Ottoman soldiers had decided to camp on the beach opposite the island. One of their horses walked along the shallow water to the island and the people hiding on the island were discovered. According to several sources there were between 640 and 850 people in total, most of whom were killed and the remaining survivors were sold into slavery in Egypt.

Shipwreck of the Imperatrix
A large wooden cross commemorates a shipwreck from 22 February 1907. It was an Österreichischer Lloyd passenger steamer, called the Imperatrix. Due to strong northwest winds 38 people died in a lifeboat that tried to reach the shore. They were all buried on the island. The Imperatrix still lies on the seabed in front of the island's cliffs and was the reason that a lighthouse was built on an island hilltop.

The lighthouse was destroyed during the Second World War by the occupying German troops.

Monastery

The monastery is dedicated to the Dormition of the Virgin. According to tradition, the name Chrysoskalitissa comes from the fact that the 98 steps to the top of the monastery would be gold (Chrysoskalitissa in Greek means, golden step).

It also hosted illegally Greek school children during the Turkish occupation in 1821. The construction of the present church began May 9, 1894.

Gallery

See also
 List of settlements in the Chania regional unit

References

External links

See Chania Region for maps
Municipality description
Chania rent a car description

Municipalities of Crete
Populated places in Chania (regional unit)
Castles in Greece
Greek War of Independence
Provinces of Greece
Catholic titular sees in Europe
Landforms of Chania (regional unit)
Uninhabited islands of Crete
Mediterranean islands
Lighthouses in Greece
Shipwrecks of Greece
Protected areas of Greece
Islands of Greece